Destilerías y Crianza del Whisky S.A. (or Whisky DYC) is a Spanish whisky company formed by businessman Nicomedes García Gómez in 1958. It is currently a subsidiary of Beam Suntory. The first distillery, built in Palazuelos de Eresma in Segovia, began operation in February 1959. In March 1963, it started to produce Whisky DYC, the first Spanish whisky. The initial production of one million liters per year climbed to twenty million per year in the 1980s. The distillery is still capable of producing this much whisky, but recently output has only been a fraction of its capacity.

Less expensive than most American, Canadian, Scotch and Irish whiskies, Whisky DYC has traditionally attracted Spaniards on a low budget. Popularly, it is mixed with non-alcoholic beverages like Coca-Cola or Fanta. The brand was quite well known in Spain during the 1990s due to its strategy of openly announcing the product as suitable for people not willing to appear high class by spending money for an imported whisky, using since 1989 the slogan "Gente sin complejos" (People with no complex).

DYC has five labels of whiskey.
DYC, blended whiskey
DYC 5, blended and aged five years in American oak
DYC 8, blended and aged eight years in American oak
DYC Pure Malt, blended and aged in oak (no age statement)
DYC Single Malt, a true single malt aged ten years

References

Spanish brands
Distilleries
Food and drink companies established in 1958
Beam Suntory
Drink companies of Spain
Spanish companies established in 1958